The Florentine florin was a gold coin struck from 1252 to 1533 with no significant change in its design or metal content standard during that time. It had 54 grains (3.499 grams, 0.113 troy ounce) of nominally pure or 'fine' gold with a purchasing power difficult to estimate (and variable) but ranging according to social grouping and perspective from approximately 140 to 1,000 modern US dollars. The name of the coin comes from the Giglio bottonato (it), the floral emblem of the city, which is represented at the head of the coin.

History
The fiorino d'oro (gold florin) was used in the Republic of Florence and was the first European gold coin struck in sufficient quantities since the 7th century to play a significant commercial role. The florin was recognized across large parts of Europe. The territorial usage of the lira and the florin often overlapped, where the lira was used for smaller transactions (wages, food purchases), the florin was for larger transactions such as those used in dowries, international trade or for tax-related matters.

The first minting of the florin occurred in 1252, at the time the value of the florin was equal to the lira, but by 1500 the florin had appreciated, seven lire amounted to one florin.

In the 14th century, about a 150 European states and local coin-issuing authorities made their own copies of the florin. The most important of these was the Hungarian forint, because the Kingdom of Hungary was a major source of European gold (until mining in the New World began to contribute to the supply in the 16th and 17th centuries, most of the gold used in Europe came from Africa).

The design of the original Florentine florins was the distinctive fleur-de-lis badge of the city on one side and on the other a standing and facing figure of St. John the Baptist wearing a cilice. On other countries' florins, the inscriptions were changed (from "Florentia" around the fleur, and the name of the saint on the other), and local heraldic devices were substituted for the fleur-de-lis. Later, other figures were often substituted for St. John. On the Hungarian forints, St. John was re-labelled St. Ladislaus, an early Christian king and patron saint of Hungary, and a battle axe substituted for the original's sceptre. Gradually the image became more regal looking.

Other coins

The term florin was borrowed elsewhere in Europe. A variant of the florin was the Rheingulden, minted by several German states encompassing the commercial centers of the Rhein (Rhine) River valley, under a series of monetary conventions starting in 1354, initially at a standard practically identical to the Florentine florin (98% gold, 3.54 grams).  By 1419, the weight had been slightly reduced (to 3.51 grams) and the alloy was substantially reduced (to 79% gold).  By 1626, the alloy had been slightly reduced again (to 77% gold), while the weight was more substantially reduced (to 3.240 grams).  In 1409, the Rheingulden standard (at the time 91.7% gold) was adopted for the Holy Roman Empire's Reichsgulden.

The Dutch guilder is symbolized as Fl. or ƒ, which means florijn (florin). 

The English coin first issued in 1344 by Edward III of England is also known as a florin. Originally valued at six shillings, it was composed of 108 grains (6.99828 grams) of gold with a purity of 23 carats and  grains (or  carats) – and more recently relating to a British pre-decimal silver coin (later nickel silver) also known as a two shilling (or two bob) "bit" (abbreviation 2/-) worth 24 pence or one-tenth of a pound.

In Ireland, a silver florin coin (worth one-tenth of an Irish pound, with Irish inscription flóirín) was minted between 1928 and 1943; it became cupronickel in 1943 and was withdrawn from use on 1/6/1994.

See also

 
 Florin (Australian coin)
 History of coins in Italy
 Soldo
 Venetian ducat
 Venetian grosso
 Venetian lira

References

Bibliography 
 
 
 
 
 Richard A. Goldthwaite, The Economy of Renaissance Florence

External links 

 Money museum:Fiorino d'Oro 
 History of the British Florin 

Guilder
Coins of Italy
Republic of Florence
Medieval currencies
Obsolete Italian currencies
Gold coins